Eurofighter Typhoon is a combat flight simulator published by Rage Software in 2001. The game models the jet fighter Eurofighter Typhoon. Digital Image Design was in process of developing the game as successor to F-22 Total Air War when the company was bought by Rage Software. An extended version of the game with an additional campaign, Eurofighter Typhoon: Operation Icebreaker, was released in 2002.

Gameplay
The story of the game posits Russia quickly invading the eastern countries of Europe. Iceland is the next one on the list, as NATO has abandoned the country in an attempt to protect the Western countries of Europe. The ICEFOR is outnumbered, but is able to deploy a small number of the new Eurofighter Typhoon aircraft to turn the tide of the war. The game also features a very extensive virtual battleground over Iceland, some of the most advanced created at the time. A dynamic camera enables watch the war in real-time. As the war unfolds, news will be delivered by an online newspaper.

The game allows the player to take over the destiny of six pilots. Each one will be assigned different missions depending on their abilities such as bombing, interception, Wild Weasel, with several of these missions even going on at the same time. The player can switch at any time between pilots, taking charge of the most critical and dangerous tasks of the mission, and leaving up to the AI the others. As the war goes on, each pilot can be injured, lost behind enemy lines after an unlucky ejection and waiting for the rescue helicopters, or taken prisoner and even be interrogated by the Russians.

Reception

The game received "average" reviews according to the review aggregation website Metacritic. Kevin Rice of NextGen said of the game, "An incredible sense of speed combined with an intuitive interface makes for an addictive flight sim."

References

External links

2001 video games
Combat flight simulators
Single-player video games
Take-Two Interactive games
Ubisoft games
Video games set in Iceland
Video games developed in the United Kingdom
Video games with expansion packs
Windows games
Windows-only games
Rage Games games
Digital Image Design games